The Fédération des associations étudiantes du campus de l'Université de Montréal (FAÉCUM) is an accredited federation of students' associations on Université de Montréal's campus. It encompasses 85 different students' associations and represents a total of 37,500 members. Its objective is to promote and defend different student interests.

See also

2005 Quebec student strike
List of Quebec students' associations

Further reading
Bédard, Éric. 1994. Histoire de la FAÉCUM : 1976-1994. [Montréal]: Fédération des associations étudiantes du campus de l'Université de Montréal.
Gravel, Denis. 2006. Histoire de la FAÉCUM (1976-2006) : Une fédération en marche. Montréal : Archiv-Histo.

External links
Official website

Université de Montréal
Quebec students' associations